Khandaker Asaduzzaman (22 October 1935 – 25 April 2020) was a Bangladeshi Civil Servant and is known as the First Finance Secretary of Independent Bangladesh in the Mujibnagar Government.

Early life
Asaduzzaman was born on 22 October 1935. He had a B.A. Honors and a M.A. degree.

Career
Asaduzzaman was a veteran of Bangladesh Liberation War. Khandaker Asaduzzaman was the first Finance Secretary of the Mujibnagar Government (Independent Bangladesh). He was elected Member of Parliament from Tangail-2 as an Awami League candidate. He was elected as a Member of Parliament 3 times; in 1996, 2008 and 2014 as a Bangladesh Awami League candidate from Tangail-2, he is succeeded by Soto Monir of Awami League. He was the President of Bangabandhu Shishu Kishore Parishad.

Asaduzzman has held various positions in the government from being appointed as the Advisor to the Prime Minister Sheikh Hasina  to holding the positions of Chairman of Bangladesh Muktijoddha Parishad, Bangabandhu Shishu Kishore Parishad, and the Chairman of the Establishment Ministry.

Asaduzzman was also elected president of Dhaka Club Limited for two consecutive years.

Death 
Asaduzzaman died on 25 April 2020.

References 

1935 births
2020 deaths
Awami League politicians
7th Jatiya Sangsad members
9th Jatiya Sangsad members
10th Jatiya Sangsad members
People from Tangail District